Maurice Aurilius Stovall (born February 21, 1985) is a former American football wide receiver and tight end in the National Football League (NFL). He was drafted by the Tampa Bay Buccaneers in the third round of the 2006 NFL Draft. He played college football at Notre Dame.

He has also been a member of the Detroit Lions and Jacksonville Jaguars.

Early years
Stovall grew up in Philadelphia and went to Archbishop John Carroll High School. Following his high school career, he played in the 2002 U.S. Army All-American Bowl.

College career
After being chosen to USA Today's first-team high school All-American list, Stovall chose to attend the University of Notre Dame. He did not start as a freshman, but played in all 13 games that season, finishing the year with 18 catches including three touchdown receptions. He was also featured on the cover of Sports Illustrated early that year. He played in every game in 2003 as well, with slightly improved statistics. However, during that year as well as 2004, Stovall was remembered more for frequently dropping potential catches rather than the plays he made. This was noted not just by fans, but also by head coach Tyrone Willingham, who benched him for three games mid-season in 2004. That year, Stovall only had one touchdown catch, and many wondered if his career would be finished after his senior season.

When Charlie Weis became Notre Dame's coach prior to the 2005 season, he sought to get Stovall back to his freshman year form. This included asking the receiver to shed about 15 pounds in the offseason. After cutting his weight to about 220, Stovall became a major player in Weis' pro-style offense. Starting every game, Stovall caught 11 touchdowns, some of them requiring acrobatics, and nearly broke Tom Gatewood's school record for single-season receiving yards. He did set new records that season for single-game receptions (14) and touchdowns (4) against BYU. After this breakout senior season, Stovall was predicted to be drafted somewhere in the 2nd to 4th rounds.

Professional career

Tampa Bay Buccaneers
Stovall was drafted by the Tampa Bay Buccaneers in the third round of the 2006 NFL Draft. A deeply religious man, he made the sign of the cross as he hauled in his first career touchdown pass against the Detroit Lions in week 7 of the 2007 NFL season. He is a competent and accomplished gunner on special teams. His former head coach Jon Gruden gave him the nickname "Gunner Stovall". In 2009, he had a career year, catching 24 passes for 366 yards in seven starts. He scored a 38-yard touchdown against the Dolphins.

Detroit Lions
On August 1, 2011, Stovall signed with the Detroit Lions.

On June 5, 2012 Stovall returned to the Lions signing a one-year deal. On August 31, 2012, Stovall was officially cut by the Lions organization.

Jacksonville Jaguars
Stovall was signed by the Jacksonville Jaguars on September 19, 2012. He was waived on December 4, 2012.

Coaching career
In 2016, Stovall joined the IMG Academy football team as their wide receivers coach.

References

1985 births
Living people
American football wide receivers
American football tight ends
Players of American football from Philadelphia
Notre Dame Fighting Irish football players
Tampa Bay Buccaneers players
Detroit Lions players
Jacksonville Jaguars players
Archbishop John Carroll High School alumni